The Clay's Ferry Bridge is a combination of three former bridges combined into one bridge. It carries Interstate 75 along with US 25 and US 421 across the Kentucky River between Madison and Fayette counties.

History
The Clay's Ferry Bridge replaced an older road bridge of the same name in 1946.  Now called the Old Clay's Ferry Bridge is a series of two Warren truss structures constructed in 1869. After the State of Kentucky purchased it, the bridge was made part of the alignment of US 25 in 1929. Prior to 1869, service across the Kentucky River was provided by ferry.

The first high-level bridge across the Kentucky River was completed in 1946, carrying two lanes of traffic (one northbound, one southbound). In 1963, a twin bridge was completed just south of the existing bridge and traffic ran in two lanes in each direction, with each span made one-way. After over two decades of use, a Fatigue Analysis of the Clays Ferry Bridge was completed. This was conducted in 1988 by Theodore Hopwood II, and Vishwas G. Oka, from the Kentucky Transportation Center Research, Report 539.

Plans were announced in 1989 to demolish the 1946 and 1963 bridges, except for their piers, and build a replacement using the old piers plus new ones. The new bridge was completed in 1998, creating three lanes in each direction and full-width shoulders. The old one lane Warren truss bridge, now called the Old Clay's Ferry Bridge is still in use.

The most recent resurface project of the Clays Ferry Bridge began on Aug 1, 2021 and was projected to be completed by oct 27 2021.  It was completed ahead of schedule on Oct 11, 2021.

References

External links
 

Road bridges in Kentucky
Transportation in Madison County, Kentucky
Transportation in Lexington, Kentucky
Buildings and structures in Madison County, Kentucky
Buildings and structures in Lexington, Kentucky
Bridges over the Kentucky River
Interstate 75
U.S. Route 25
U.S. Route 421
Bridges of the United States Numbered Highway System
Bridges on the Interstate Highway System